Thatcheria janae is a species of sea snail, a marine gastropod mollusk in the family Raphitomidae.

Description
The length of the shell attains 67 mm.

Distribution
This marine species occurs off Western Australia.

References

 Lorenz F. & Stahlschmidt P. (2019). An overlooked second species of Thatcheria from Western Australia (Gastropoda: Conoidea: Raphitomidae). Conchylia. 50(1-4): 55–62.

External links
 Gastropods.com: Thatcheria janae

janae
Gastropods described in 2019
Gastropods of Australia